Rocca Susella is a comune (municipality) in the Province of Pavia in the Italian region Lombardy, located about 60 km south of Milan and about 30 km south of Pavia.

Rocca Susella borders the following municipalities: Borgo Priolo, Godiasco, Montesegale, Retorbido, Rivanazzano Terme, Torrazza Coste.

References

Cities and towns in Lombardy